In re Winship, 397 U.S. 358 (1970), was a United States Supreme Court decision that held that "the Due Process Clause protects the accused against conviction except upon proof beyond a reasonable doubt of every fact necessary to constitute the crime charged." It established this burden in all cases in all states (constitutional case). The decision did not specify which facts constitute the charged crime. 

In an opinion authored by Justice Brennan, the Court held that when a juvenile is charged with an act that would be a crime if committed by an adult, every element of the offense must be proved beyond reasonable doubt, not preponderance of the evidence. The case has come to stand for a broader proposition, however: in a criminal prosecution, every essential element of the offense must be proved beyond reasonable doubt. See, e.g., Apprendi v. New Jersey, 530 U.S. 466, 477 (2000); Sullivan v. Louisiana, 508 U.S. 275, 278 (1993). This case marked a rejection of the preponderance of evidence standard in any criminal cases and expanded the protections afforded by the Due Process Clause.

See also
List of United States Supreme Court cases, volume 397

References

External links
 

United States Supreme Court cases
United States Supreme Court cases of the Burger Court
United States criminal burden of proof case law
United States children's rights case law
Juvenile case law
1970 in United States case law